Inquisitor solomonensis is a species of sea snail, a marine gastropod mollusk in the family Pseudomelatomidae, the turrids and allies.

Description
The length of the shell varies between 20 mm and 27 mm.

Distribution
This marine species occurs off New Guinea, the Philippines and the Fiji Islands

References

External links

 
 Gastropods.com: Inquisitor solomonensis

solomonensis
Gastropods described in 1876